Leonard Cy Dollaga (born 1968) is a United States Navy rear admiral who has served as the Chief of Legislative Affairs since May 13, 2022. He most recently served as the Commander of Submarine Group 7, Task Force 74, and Task Force 54 from August 28, 2020 to April 13, 2022. He was previously the commander of the Undersea Warfighting Development Center from May 24, 2018, to June 18, 2020.

Raised in Vallejo, California, Dollaga is a 1990 graduate of the United States Naval Academy with a Bachelor of Science degree in mechanical engineering. He later earned a master's degree in engineering management from George Washington University.

References

1968 births
Living people
Place of birth missing (living people)
People from Vallejo, California
United States Naval Academy alumni
George Washington University alumni
United States submarine commanders
Recipients of the Legion of Merit
United States Navy admirals